The Patriarch of All Bulgaria is the patriarch of the Bulgarian Orthodox Church. The patriarch is officially styled as Patriarch of All Bulgaria and Metropolitan of Sofia. Patriarch Neophyte acceded to this position on 24 February 2013.

History

Medieval era
Following two decisive victories over the Byzantines at Achelous (near the present-day city of Burgas) and Katasyrtai (near Constantinople), the autonomous Bulgarian Archbishopric was proclaimed autocephalous and elevated to the rank of patriarchate at an ecclesiastical and national council held in 918 or 919. As a result of the Treaty of 927, which affirmed the Bulgarian victory in the Byzantine–Bulgarian war of 913–927, the Patriarchate of Constantinople recognized the autocephalous status of the Bulgarian Orthodox Church and acknowledged its patriarchal dignity. Demetrius of Bulgaria was the second Patriarch of the Bulgarian Orthodox Church and the first one to have been recognized by the Ecumenical Patriarch of Constantinople Thus, the Bulgarian Patriarchate became the first national patriarchate in Europe, and the sixth autocephalous patriarchate after the five forming the Pentarchy – those of Jerusalem, Antioch, Alexandria, Rome, and Constantinople. The seat of the patriarchate was the new Bulgarian capital of Preslav although the patriarch is likely to have resided in the town of Drastar (Silistra), an old Christian centre famous for its martyrs and Christian traditions.

Ottoman conquest
After the fall of the capital of the Second Bulgarian Empire, Tarnovo, to the Ottomans in 1393 and the exile of Patriarch Euthymius, the autocephalous Bulgarian Church was destroyed. The Bulgarian diocese was again subordinated to the Patriarchate of Constantinople.

Modern era
Conditions for the restoration of the Bulgarian Patriarchate were created after World War II. In 1945 the Patriarch of Constantinople recognised the autocephaly of the Bulgarian Church. In 1950, the Holy Synod adopted a new statute which paved the way for the restoration of the patriarchate and in 1953, it elected the metropolitan of Plovdiv, Cyril, Bulgarian patriarch. After the death of Patriarch Cyril in 1971, the Church elected in his place Maxim, the metropolitan of Lovech, who was the Bulgarian patriarch until his death in 2012. For an interim leader on 10 November 2012 was chosen Metropolitan Cyril of Varna and Veliki Preslav, who organized the election of a new patriarch. On February 24, 2013 Neophyte of Bulgaria was elected as the new patriarch.

See also
List of patriarchs of the Bulgarian Orthodox Church
Official visits by the Patriarch of Bulgaria

References

 Bulgaria
Bulgarian Orthodox Church